Laura Schirmer Mapleson (1862–1894) was an American operatic singer in the Victorian era of the 1880–90s.

Biography
Born Laura Marguerite Schirmer in 1862, as a child she began singing in her native Boston. As a teenager she trained in Leipzig, Berlin, and Vienna and appeared in a New York City concert by Franz Rummel. She performed in New York and Boston and in 1883 went to Europe where she married a tenor Arthur Byron in Italy. She appeared at Pisa in Italy, Turkey, Russia and Germany. She appeared in command performance before Turkish ruler Sultan Abdul Hamid II and was scheduled to sing again before his court, but a reporter in Trimm's Petit Journal alleged that she and others had been poisoned in the Sultan's court. She married her second husband Henry Mapleson in Paris in 1890.

She died January 24, 1894, at New York's Everett House of pneumonia, from influenza contracted while performing at the Pittsburgh Opera House on January 13, 1894.

References

External links

 Cabinet card portraits(archived)
Music to FADETTE; Mapleson Opera Co.(New York Public Library, Billy Rose collection)
 portrait of Madame Schirmer Mapleson (by Alex Bassano)

1862 births
1894 deaths
19th-century American singers
19th-century American women singers
Singers from Massachusetts
Infectious disease deaths in Massachusetts
People from Boston
American opera singers
Deaths from influenza